Irena Grafenauer, (born June 19, 1957 in Ljubljana, Slovenia), is a Slovenian flute player and soloist, a pupil of Boris Čampa, Karlheinz Zöller and Aurèle Nicolet.

Irena Grafenauer started her musical education at the age of 8. After graduating from the Academy of Music in Ljubljana in 1974, she continued her studies with Karlheinz Zöller and Aurèle Nicolet. She won First Prize in three international competitions: in Belgrade (1974), Geneva (1978) and Munich (1979). From 1977 to 1987 she was principal flautist with the Bavarian Radio Symphony Orchestra under Rafael Kubelik and Sir Colin Davis. On October 1987 she was appointed Professor at the Salzburg Mozarteum.
She has successfully toured most European countries, the United States, Japan, and Australia as a soloist. She has performed regularly at Gidon Kremer’s Lockenhaus Festival since 1981 and toured extensively with ”Kremer & Friends”.

Irena Grafenauer formed a duo with the harpist Maria Graf. She has also worked regularly with the Berlin Philharmonic Duo Jörg Baumann and Klaus Stoll, pianists Oleg Maisenberg, Robert Levin, and Helmut Deutsch, guitarist Eliot Fisk, and the Cherubini String Quartet.

Irena Grafenauer records exclusively for the Philips label. She has been contracted to record concertos and quartets by Mozart with members of the Academy of St. Martin-in-the-Fields and the French album with music by Debussy, Ravel, Ibert and Roussel.

She currently teaches in Mozarteum, Salzburg.

References 

Slovenian flautists
Classical flautists
1957 births
Living people
Prešeren Award laureates
Musicians from Ljubljana
Women flautists